Aptenodytes ridgeni, also referred to as Ridgen's penguin, is an extinct species of penguin from the Pliocene of New Zealand. It was intermediate in size between its living congeners, standing an estimated 90–100 cm tall. The remains were first found in 1968 on a Canterbury region beach by 11-year-old schoolboy Alan Ridgen.

References

Aptenodytes
Extinct birds of New Zealand
Extinct penguins
Pliocene birds
Fossil taxa described in 1972